Deanna Doig (born March 13, 1972 in Bethune, Saskatchewan) is a Canadian curler from Emerald Park, Saskatchewan.

Career
Doing has been active on the World Curling Tour since the 2005–06 season, when she joined the Heather Rankin rink as her third. In their first season, the team played in the 2006 Canada Cup of Curling, finishing with a 1–4 record. The next season, the team played in several Grand Slam events, making the quarterfinals at the 2006 Trail Appliances Autumn Gold Curling Classic. The following season, the team played made it to the quarterfinals of the 2007 Casinos of Winnipeg Classic and went 0–5 at the 2008 Canada Cup of Curling.

In 2008, Doig joined the Michelle Englot rink as her third. The team would win Doig's lone career Grand Slam title at the 2008 Casinos of Winnipeg Classic. They also made it to the quarterfinals at the 2008 Wayden Transportation Ladies Classic. The team played in the 2009 Canada Cup of Curling, losing in the playoffs after posting a 3–2 round robin record. The next season the team played at the 2009 Canadian Olympic Trials qualifier, losing all three of their games. The next season Doig was moved to the lead position on the team. The team found little success that season and disbanded at its conclusion.

In 2011, Doig began skipping her own team. She played in the 2012 Colonial Square Ladies Classic with teammates Kim Schneider, Colleen Ackerman and Michelle McIvor, Doig's first Slam as a skip. She would win just one match, failing to make the playoffs.

Doig joined the newly formed Penny Barker rink in 2013 with Tamara Haberstock at second and Sarah Slywka at lead. They played in the 2013 Colonial Square Ladies Classic, where her team made it all the way to the quarterfinals. They began the 2014–15 season by playing in the 2014 Colonial Square Ladies Classic, failing to advance to the playoffs. They were however able to win two Saskatchewan Curling Tour events, qualifying her rink for the 2015 Saskatchewan Scotties Tournament of Hearts, where they finished 2–3. The next season, her rink of Barker, Hoffmann and Sicinski finished 3–3 at the 2016 Saskatchewan Scotties Tournament of Hearts, once again failing to advance.

Team Barker won the 2017 Saskatchewan Scotties Tournament of Hearts the following season despite entering the tournament as an underdog. Her team finished 4–4 through the round robin before winning the tiebreaker and three straight playoff games to claim the title. She defeated heavily favored teams Stefanie Lawton in the semifinal and Robyn Silvernagle in the final by scoring four in the tenth end. At the 2017 Scotties Tournament of Hearts, they were one of two teams making their debut appearance at the hearts and it showed as they finished the round robin with a 1–10 record, only defeating Nova Scotia's Mary Mattatall.

With her Saskatchewan Scotties championship rink, Doig and her team had a good start to the 2017–18 season, winning the DEKALB Superspiel on the World Curling Tour. They also finished runner-up at the Medicine Hat Charity Classic and won two Saskatchewan Curling Tour events. She would not defend her provincial title however, losing in the 3 vs. 4 page playoff game at the 2018 Saskatchewan Scotties Tournament of Hearts to Sherry Anderson, who went on to win the event. The rink added Christie Gamble to the lineup for the 2018–19 season, replacing Schneider. They qualified for the 2019 Saskatchewan Scotties Tournament of Hearts, but failed to advance to the playoffs after a 4–4 round robin record. The team stayed intact the following season and won three more Saskatchewan Tour events. Their successful results qualified them for the 2020 Saskatchewan Scotties Tournament of Hearts, which was held in a triple knockout format this year. They qualified for the playoffs through the C side before losing to the Sherry Anderson rink in 3 vs. 4 game, like in 2018.

Personal life
Doig is employed as an engineer for TransCanada. She is married.

Teams

References

External links

Living people
1972 births
Canadian women curlers
Curlers from Saskatchewan
Canadian women engineers
21st-century women engineers
Canada Cup (curling) participants